Kim Yong-jae ( or  ; born 7 September 1952) is a North Korean diplomat and politician. He was the Ambassador Extraordinary and Plenipotentiary of the Democratic People's Republic of Korea to the Russian Federation. He is currently the North Korean Minister of External Economic Relations.

See also

 Embassy of North Korea in Moscow

References 

North Korean diplomats
Living people
Ambassadors of North Korea to Russia
Government ministers of North Korea
1952 births
People from Kangwon Province (North Korea)